Sir George Throckmorton (c. 1480 – 6 August 1552) of Coughton Court in Warwickshire, England, was a Member of Parliament during the reign of King Henry VIII.

Origins

Born before 1489 in Worcestershire, he was the eldest son and heir of Sir Robert Throckmorton of Coughton Court, a soldier, courtier and Councillor to King Henry VII, by his wife Catherine Marrow, a daughter of Sir William Marowe (or Marrow), Lord Mayor of London. The Throckmorton family (originally de Throckmorton) took its surname from the manor of Throckmorton in the parish of Fladbury, Worcestershire, which from the 12th century they held under the overlordship of the Bishop of Worcester. They acquired the manor of Coughton by marriage in the early 15th century.

Marriage and issue

In 1512 he married Katherine Vaux, the eldest daughter of Nicholas Vaux, 1st Baron Vaux of Harrowden by his first wife Elizabeth FitzHugh. Elizabeth FitzHugh's first husband had been William Parr, 1st Baron Parr of Kendal, and thus Katherine's maternal half-brother was Sir Thomas Parr, the father of Queen Catherine Parr. By his wife he had eight sons and nine daughters as follows:

Sons
Sir Robert Throckmorton (c. 1513 - 12 February 1581) of Coughton Court, eldest son and heir, who married firstly, in about 1527, Muriel Berkeley (d. 1542). He married secondly Elizabeth Hussey (c.1510-1554), widow of Walter Hungerford, 1st Baron Hungerford of Heytesbury, and daughter of John Hussey, 1st Baron Hussey of Sleaford.
Kenelm Throckmorton (c. 1512 - 15??), 2nd son, who married and had issue.
Clement Throckmorton (c. 1512 – 14 December 1573), of Haseley in Warwickshire, who married Katherine Neville, eldest daughter of Sir Edward Neville of Addington Park in Kent by his wife, Eleanor Windsor, a daughter of Andrew Windsor, 1st Baron Windsor, by whom he had six sons and seven daughters, including Job Throckmorton.
Sir Nicholas Throckmorton (1515–1571), father of Elizabeth "Bess'" Throckmorton, a lady-in-waiting to Queen Elizabeth I and married Sir Walter Raleigh the explorer.
Thomas Throckmorton, (born c. 1522).
Sir John Throckmorton (c. 1524 - 22 May 1580), father of the conspirator Francis Throckmorton.
Anthony Throckmorton (born c. 1528).
George Throckmorton, (c. 1533 – 1612).

Daughters
Elizabeth Throckmorton, who married thrice, firstly to Sir John Gifford, secondly to William Lygon and thirdly to George Peyto.
Mary Throckmorton (born c.1530), who married Sir John Huband;
Katherine Throckmorton, whose husband's first name was Thomas;
Anne Throckmorton (c. 1532-21 Dec 1553), who married John Digby; 
Margaret Throckmorton (b. circa 1536), who married firstly a member of the Catesby family, and secondly Brian Cave (c. 1532-21 Dec 1553), of Ingarsby, and had issue.
Katherine Throckmorton (c. 1532-21 Dec 1553), who married firstly Thomas Winter, and secondly Thomas Smith.
Margery Throckmorton(c. 1532-21 Dec 1553).
Amy Throckmorton.
Elizabeth Throckmorton.

Death and legacy
Throckmorton died on 12 August 1552 and was buried in Coughton Church, where survives the monument he himself designed.

See also
The Tudors, season 2, episode 2

Principal source
S. M. Thorpe, biography of Throckmorton, Sir George (by 1489-1552), of Coughton, Warws., published in History of Parliament: House of Commons 1509-1558, ed. S.T. Bindoff, 1982

Notes

References

1480s births
1552 deaths
English politicians
English Roman Catholics
English MPs 1529–1536
George
English knights
Recusants

es:George Throckmorton#top